The 2nd Regiment of Life Guards was a cavalry regiment in the British Army, part of the Household Cavalry. It was formed in 1788 by the union of the 2nd Troop of Horse Guards and 2nd Troop of Horse Grenadier Guards. In 1922, it was amalgamated with the 1st Life Guards to form the Life Guards.

History
The regiment was formed in 1788 by the union of the 2nd Troop of Horse Guards and 2nd Troop of Horse Grenadier Guards. It fought in the Peninsular War, under the command of Major-General Charles Barton, and at the Waterloo. In 1877, it was renamed 2nd Life Guards and contributed to the Household Cavalry Composite Regiment in the Anglo-Egyptian War, in the Second Boer War and in the First World War from August to November 1914. From 1916 to 1918, the Reserve Regiment contributed to the Household Battalion. In 1918, the regiment was converted to the 2nd Battalion, Guards Machine Gun Regiment. It was reconstituted in 1919 and was amalgamated with the 1st Life Guards in 1922 to form the Life Guards.

Battle honours
The battle honours of the regiment were:
 Early Wars: Dettingen, Peninsula, Waterloo, Tel-el-Kebir, Egypt 1882, Relief of Kimberley, Paardeberg, South Africa 1899–1900
 The Great War:  Mons, Le Cateau, Retreat from Mons, Marne 1914, Aisne 1914, Messines 1914, Armentières 1914, Ypres 1914 '15 '17, Langemarck 1914, Gheluvelt, Nonne Bosschen, St. Julien, Frezenberg, Somme 1916 '18, Albert 1916, Arras 1917 '18, Scarpe 1917, Broodseinde, Poelcappelle, Passchendaele, Bapaume 1918, Hindenburg Line, Épehy, St. Quentin Canal, Beaurevoir, Cambrai 1918, Selle, France and Flanders 1914–18

Colonels-in-Chief
The Colonels-in-Chief of the regiment were:
1815 King George IV
1831 King William IV
1837 vacant
1880 F.M. The Prince of Wales, later King Edward VII
1910 F.M. King George V

Regimental Colonels
The Colonels of the regiment were:
1788–1797: F.M. Sir Jeffrey Amherst, 1st Baron Amherst, KB
1797–1843: Gen. William Cathcart, 1st Earl Cathcart, KT
1843–1854: Gen. Charles Stewart, 3rd Marquess of Londonderry, KG, GCB, GCH 
1854–1863: F.M. Sir John Colborne, 1st Baron Seaton, GCB, GCMG, GCH
1863: Gen. Henry Beauchamp Lygon, 4th Earl Beauchamp
1863–1876: F.M. George Hay, 8th Marquess of Tweeddale, KT, GCB 
1876–1890: Gen. George Upton, 3rd Viscount Templetown, GCB
1890–1900: Gen. Richard William Penn Curzon-Howe, 3rd Earl Howe, GCVO, CB
1900–1905: Gen. Frederick Augustus Thesiger, 2nd Baron Chelmsford, GCB, GCVO
1905–1907: F.M. Sir Francis Grenfell, 1st Baron Grenfell, GCB, GCMG 
1907–1919: Lt-Gen. Douglas Cochrane, 12th Earl of Dundonald, KCB, KCVO 
1919–1922: Maj-Gen. Sir Cecil Edward Bingham, GCVO, KCMG, CB

See also
Life Guards
British cavalry during the First World War

References

Sources
 

2-002 Regiment of Life Guards
LG2
Household Cavalry
Former guards regiments
Military units and formations established in 1788
Military units and formations disestablished in 1922